The 2014–15 Arizona Coyotes season was the 36th season for the National Hockey League franchise that was established on June 22, 1979, the 19th season since the franchise relocated from Winnipeg following the 1995–96 NHL season, and the 43rd overall, including the World Hockey Association years. It was also their first season as the "Arizona Coyotes" – the team had been called the "Phoenix Coyotes" for the previous 18 years.

Off-season 
The club officially changed their team name to the "Arizona Coyotes" on June 27, 2014, at the 2014 NHL Entry Draft. The name change was part of the deal approved by the City of Glendale to keep the team from relocating.

Training camp 
The Coyotes competed in eight preseason exhibition games before the start of the 2014–15 regular season.

Standings

Schedule and results

Pre-season

Regular season

Player statistics 
Final stats
Skaters

Goaltenders

†Denotes player spent time with another team before joining the Coyotes.  Stats reflect time with the Coyotes only.
‡Traded mid-season
Bold/italics denotes franchise record

Notable achievements

Awards

Milestones

Transactions 
The Coyotes have been involved in the following transactions during the 2014–15 season.

Trades

Free agents acquired

Free agents lost

Claimed via waivers

Lost via waivers

Player signings 
The following players were signed by the Coyotes. Two-way contracts are marked with an asterisk (*).

Draft picks 

The 2014 NHL Entry Draft will be held on June 27–28, 2014, at the Wells Fargo Center in Philadelphia, Pennsylvania.

Draft notes
 The Chicago Blackhawks second-round pick went to the Arizona Coyotes as the result of a trade on March 4, 2014, that sent David Rundblad, Mathieu Brisebois to the Blackhawks in exchange for this pick.
 The Arizona Coyotes third-round pick went to the Montreal Canadiens as the result of a trade on June 28, 2014, that sent a third and fourth-round pick in 2014 to Arizona in exchange for this pick.
 The Arizona Coyotes' fourth-round pick went to the Toronto Maple Leafs as the result of a  trade on January 16, 2013, that sent Matthew Lombardi to the Coyotes in exchange for this pick.
 The New Jersey Devils seventh-round pick went to the Arizona Coyotes as the result of a trade on April 3, 2013, that sent Steve Sullivan to the Devils in exchange for this pick.

References 

Arizona Coyotes seasons
Arizona
Arizona
Coyotes
Coyotes